Prabhat Mishra is a software consultant  of Cargill Business services in India. web|url=https://www.cise.ufl.edu/~prabhat/|title=Prabhat Mishra, Professor, University of Florida|website=www.cise.ufl.edu|access-date=2020-04-05}}</ref> Prof. Mishra's research interests are in hardware security, quantum computing, embedded systems, system-on-chip validation, formal verification, and machine learning.

Biography 
Born and raised in India, Mishra received his Ph.D. in Computer Science from the University of California at Irvine in 2004. He received a B.E. in Computer Science  from the Jadavpur University, India in 1994, and M.Tech. in Computer Science from the Indian Institute of Technology, Kharagpur, India in 1995. In 2004, he joined University of Florida as an Assistant Professor. In 2010, he was promoted to an Associate Professor and by 2016 he became a Professor at the same institution. He currently lives in Gainesville, Florida with his family.

Academic Life 
His research has been recognized by Best Paper Awards and Best Paper Award Nominations at several international conferences. Dr. Mishra currently serves as an Associate Editor of the IEEE Transactions on VLSI Systems and ACM Transactions on Embedded Computing Systems. In 2015, he was selected as an ACM Distinguished Scientist.   He was named a Fellow of the Institute of Electrical and Electronics Engineers in 2021 for contributions to system-on-chip validation and design automation of embedded systems.  He was elected a Fellow of the American Association for the Advancement of Science in 2023 .

Awards 

 AAAS Fellow, American Association for the Advancement of Science, 2023.
 IEEE Fellow, Institute of Electrical and Electronics Engineers, 2021.
 UF Research Foundation Professor, University of Florida, 2020.
 IET Outstanding Editor Award, Institution of Engineering and Technology, 2019.
 ISQED Best Paper Award, International Symposium on Quality Electronic Design, 2016. 
 ACM Distinguished Scientist, Association for Computing Machinery, 2015. 
 IBM Faculty Award, 2015.
 VLSI Design Best Paper Award, International Conference on VLSI Design, 2011.
 NSF CAREER Award, US National Science Foundation, 2008.
 EDAA Outstanding Dissertation Award, European Design Automation Association, 2004.
 CODES+ISSS Best Paper Award, International Conference on Codesign & System Synthesis, 2003.

Books 

 Network-on-Chip Security and Privacy, Springer, 2021.
System-on-Chip Security Validation and Verification, Springer, 2019.
 Post-Silicon Validation and Debug, Springer, 2018.
 Hardware IP Security and Trust, Springer, 2017.
 System-Level Validation, Springer, 2012.
 Dynamic Reconfiguration in Real-Time Systems, Springer, 2012.
 Processor Description Languages - Applications and Methodologies, Morgan Kaufmann, 2008.
 Functional Verification of Programmable Embedded Architectures, Springer, 2005.

References

External links 

 Prabhat Mishra home page
 Prabhat Mishra publications indexed by Google Scholar

American computer scientists
Living people
Computer hardware researchers
Fellow Members of the IEEE
University of Florida faculty
IIT Kharagpur alumni
Indian emigrants to the United States
Jadavpur University alumni
Indian computer scientists
Computer science writers
Year of birth missing (living people)